Qamishli Subdistrict  is a subdistrict of Qamishli District in northeastern al-Hasakah Governorate, northeastern Syria. Administrative centre is the city of Qamishli.

At the 2004 census, the subdistrict had a population of 232,095.

Cities, towns and villages

References 

Qamishli District
Qamishli
Divided cities on the Turkish-Syrian border